James Thindwa is a community organizer in the Chicago, Illinois area. He heads Chicago Jobs with Justice, where he organizes for workers rights.
He was born to Malawian parents in Zimbabwe.

Thindwa  attended Berea College, where he was a scholarship recipient and went on to earn a master's degree at Miami University in Ohio.

He joined Chicago Alliance of Charter Teachers and Staff (Chicago ACTS) in June 2009.

He is on the board of directors and a contributor to newsmagazine In These Times, a nonprofit and independent newsmagazine committed to political and economic democracy.

Thindwa was the featured subject on PBS's Bill Moyers Journal. He was the partner of Martha Biondi, a professor of African American studies at Northwestern University.

Awards
Howard M. Metzenbaum Award 2010.

References

Year of birth missing (living people)
Living people
People from Chicago
Berea College alumni
Miami University alumni
American people of Malawian descent
Zimbabwean emigrants to the United States